The 1925–26 season was the 51st season of competitive football in England. This marked the year that Huddersfield Town won the League three years running, making them the first team in Football League history to do so.

Honours

Football League

First Division

Second Division

Third Division North

Third Division South

Top goalscorers

First Division
Ted Harper (Blackburn Rovers) – 43 goals

Second Division
Jimmy Trotter (The Wednesday) – 37 goals

Third Division North
Jimmy Cookson (Chesterfield) – 44 goals

Third Division South
Jack Cock (Plymouth Argyle) – 32 goals

References